Atteva numeratrix is a moth of the  family Attevidae. It is found in Brazil.

External links
A review of the New World Atteva (Walker) moths (Yponomeutidae, Attevinae)

Attevidae
Moths described in 1930